Eldon is a village in County Durham, England. It is situated a few miles south-west of Bishop Auckland, a short distance from Shildon. It gives its name to the peerage of the Earls of Eldon.

The village became a civil parish, with a parish council, on 1 April 2003.  It had previously been part of Shildon parish. The population of this civil parish as at the 2011 census was 327.

References

External links

Villages in County Durham